Made in Sweden is the debut studio album by Swedish singer-songwriter E-Type, released by Stockholm Records on 31 October 1994.

Critical reception
Pan-European magazine Music & Media wrote, "The country of origin firmly stamped on it means a strong recommendation for top flight Euro product. "Set the World On Fire" was a summer hit in Sweden; "This Is the Way" is the current number 1. Long-haired E-Type is surrounded by the proverbial female backup singer(s), but isn't pretending to be a black rapper. With that weird half singing/half speaking voice, he's rather like the Troggs' Reg Presley branching out to dance. The producer's name is a guarantee for Pop sense. Almost blindfolded one can select three more singles: the ragga track "So Dem Come", the shamelessly Euro number "Fight Them Back" and the Oriental-flavoured reggae "When Religion Comes To Town"."

Track listing

Credits
Co-producer – E-Type
Design [Sleeve] – Mikael P. Eriksson, Reagera, Tomas Perman [D.D.D]
Executive producer – Denniz Pop
Lyrics by – E-Type, Mud (3) (tracks: 2 to 8, 10, 12)
Mastered by – Björn Engelmann
Music by – E-Type (tracks: 1 to 9, 11, 12)
Producer – Denniz PoP (tracks: 2 to 5, 11), E-Type (tracks: 1, 7, 10, 12), Max Martin (tracks: 3, 5, 9 to 11)

Chart

References

1994 debut albums
E-Type (musician) albums
Albums produced by Denniz Pop
Albums produced by Max Martin
Albums recorded at Cheiron Studios